Dastaan or Dastan (lit. story) may refer to:

Dastan, an ornate form of oral history from Central Asia and Azerbaijan
Dastaan (epic form), long epic stories in the Persian and Urdu language
Dastan (1950 film), a Bollywood drama film
Dastaan (1972 film), a Hindi film
Dastaan (1995 TV series), a TV show that aired on Zee TV in mid 1990s
Dastaan (2010 TV series), a 2010 Pakistani drama serial dramatized by Sameera Fazal
Dastan, the protagonist of the 2010 film Prince of Persia: The Sands of Time